There are several rivers named Urubu River in Brazil:

 Urubu River (Amazonas)
 Urubu River (Rio de Janeiro)
 Urubu River (Roraima), a river of Roraima
 Urubu Grande River